Rafflesia micropylora is a parasitic plant species of the genus Rafflesia. It is endemic to Sumatra in Indonesia.

This species was named because of the small opening of its diaphragm or corona.  This is one of the giant species of Rafflesia; the largest specimen being one found by ecologist/author Arnold Newman and his son Gandhi at Gunung Leuser, northern Sumatra in 1983, a whole year before publication of the official description. This one measured 38 in (97 cm) in width, and estimated by Newman senior to weigh 36 lbs (16.3 kg) Unlike the bold markings of species like R. arnoldi, R. micropylora is covered with a myriad of tiny markings. The very small aperture of the corona suggests that its pollination strategy may also be quite different.

References

External links
 Parasitic Plant Connection: Rafflesia micropylora page

micropylora
Parasitic plants
Endemic flora of Sumatra